The Association for Recorded Sound Collections (ARSC) is a nonprofit organization dedicated to the preservation and study of sound recordings.  Established in 1966, members include record collectors, discographers, and audio engineers, together with librarians, curators, archivists, and researchers.

History
ARSC was founded in 1966 by a group of academics, primarily music librarians, who felt that contemporary professional associations such as the Music Library Association (MLA) were not paying enough attention to the special needs of recorded sound archives, and that scholars were giving too little attention to historical recorded sound as opposed to printed sources. In contrast to professional organizations such as the MLA and the American Library Association, ARSC by design also welcomed private record collectors, since they held (and needed to preserve) many important recordings that were not present in institutional collections. Furthermore, ARSC was intended to bring together collectors from all genres, classical, jazz, popular, etc., as well as those concerned with spoken word recordings.

After three organizational meetings in 1965 and 1966, and the election of its first president, Philip L. Miller, Chief of the Music Division, New York Public Library, ARSC's first annual conference was held at Indiana University in March 1967. Its first publication was the Preliminary Directory of Sound Recording Collections in the United States and Canada (1967), listing 1,500 public and private collections. This was followed by the launch of the ARSC Journal (1968), the ARSC Newsletter (1977), and other publications. Other important projects have included The Rigler-Deutsch Index, a union catalog of the 615,000 78 rpm holdings of five major public archives. Data from this massive project is now part of the WorldCat online library catalog.

ARSC is governed by an eight-person board of directors, seven of whom are elected biennially by the membership. The eighth, the executive director, is appointed by the president with the approval of the board, is non-voting, and handles day-to-day operations. In the early years ARSC's leadership consisted primarily of professional archivists, but in later years it broadened to include scholars and private collectors, several of whom have served as president. A historical listing of officers and committee chairs can be found on the association's website.

Although ARSC is based in the U.S., about ten percent of its membership is located in other countries. The association maintains close relations with the International Association of Sound and Audiovisual Archives (IASA) and is a member of the Coordinating Council of Audiovisual Archives Associations (CCAAA), an international umbrella group concerned with audiovisual preservation matters worldwide.

Presidents
 2020-2022 - Rebecca Chandler
 2018-2020 - Cary Ginell
 2016-2018 - Matthew Barton
 2014-2016 - Patrick Feaster 
 2012-2014 - Tim Brooks 
 2010-2012 - Vincent Pelote 
 2008-2010 - David Seubert 
 2006-2008 - Sam Brylawski 
 2004-2006 - Brenda Nelson-Strauss 
 2002-2004 - James Farrington 
 2000-2002 - Mark Tolleson 
 1998-2000 - Suzanne Stover 
 1996-1998 - Ted P. Sheldon 
 1994-1996 - Jerome F.Weber 
 1992-1994 - Martin A. Silver 
 1990-1992 - Barbara Sawka 
 1988-1990 - Donald E. McCormick 
 1986-1988 - Michael Biel 
 1984-1986 - Michael H. Gray 
 1982-1984 - Tim Brooks 
 1980-1982 - David Hall 
 1978-1980 - Garrett Bowles 
 1976-1978 - Gerald D. Gibson 
 1974-1976 - Robert Carneal 
 1971-1974 - Don L. Roberts
 1966-1971 - Philip L. Miller

Annual conference

ARSC has held an annual conference each year since 1967.  It generally takes place over three days between April and June in a city in the United States, though two conferences have taken place in Canada and one in London. Several conferences have been held jointly with the International Association of Sound and Audiovisual Archives. Typically, there are two session tracks, one focusing on artists and repertoire, musical genres, collecting, and discographies, the other on technical issues of audio preservation and restoration, library cataloging issues, the history of recorded sound, etc. Cumulatively, approximately 1,200 papers and panels have been presented through 2015, and nearly all have been professionally audio (and sometimes video) recorded and made available to members. A project is currently underway to digitize and post them online. In addition, since 2012 workshops conducted in conjunction with the conference have been streamed live.

Publications
The ARSC Journal is a peer-reviewed journal that has been in existence since 1968.  Currently published semi-annually, it “serves to document the history of sound recording and includes original articles on many aspects of research and preservation: biography; cataloging; copyright law; current research; discography; technical aspects of sound restoration, etc., etc.”  It also includes reviews of books and sound recordings, as well as an ongoing bibliography of articles of interest that have appeared in other journals. In all, more than 2,200 articles and reviews have been published through 2015, all of which are now available online. The ARSC Newsletter, containing association news, is published three times a year, and a Membership Directory is published electronically each year. Other publications include the ARSC Guide to Audio Preservation (2015), a guide for smaller public and private collections.

Awards

Beginning in 1991 ARSC has presented a number of Awards for Excellence “to authors and publishers of books, articles, or recording liner notes, to recognize outstanding published research in the field of recorded sound.”  Each year, a Lifetime Achievement Award is presented for recorded sound research and publication, and an Award for Distinguished Service to Historical Recordings is presented for other contributions to the field.

Grants

The Research Grants Program supports the research involving audio preservation and sound recordings, including discographies and historical studies of the sound recording industry.  The Preservation of Classical Music Historical Recordings Grants Program supports “the preservation of historically significant sound recordings of Western Art Music.”  ARSC also provides a modest number of Travel Grants for first-time attendees at the annual conference.

Email discussion list and social media

ARSClist is an unmoderated email discussion list sponsored by ARSC.  Subscription is open to members and to the archival community at large. ARSC also has a presence on Facebook, Twitter, LinkedIn, and YouTube, among other places.

Committees

Copyright and Fair Use

Since 2005, the Copyright and Fair Use Committee has led the organization in advocating for changes in U.S. copyright laws to ensure the preservation of and public access to historical sound recordings. This has included testimony at U.S. Copyright Office hearings and a number of studies and position papers. Currently, there are no sound recordings in the public domain. Recordings made after 1972 are covered by Federal copyright laws; pre-1972 recordings remain under state laws until 2067 (assuming that copyright term will not be extended again).  Making copies of recordings is a violation of copyright law; therefore, libraries and archives may not legally be able to perform necessary preservation work. Public access is limited by rights holders who will neither release historical material nor allow others to do so. In 2009 ARSC was instrumental in securing legislation directing the Copyright Office to study the status of pre-1972 recordings, which resulted in a Copyright Office recommendation that Congress address this problem. ARSC also favors changes in copyright law related to orphan works.

In 2008 ARSC co-founded with other organizations the Historical Recording Coalition for Access and Preservation to pursue these issues, and the Copyright and Fair Use Committee keeps members informed of news related to sound recording copyright and fair use issues.

Technical

The Technical Committee focuses on audio technology, providing guidance to institutions and audio professionals in preserving and maintaining access to sound recordings.

Education and Training

The Education and Training Committee provides publications and online resources, and conducts a workshop at the annual conference covering topics that have included copyright, grant applications, disaster recovery, and the preservation and handling of digital resources.

See also
 Coordinating Council of Audiovisual Archives Association
 UNESCO Memory of the World
 UNESCO World Day for Audiovisual Heritage
 Optical media preservation

References

External links
 Association For Recorded Sound Collections
 U.S. Copyright - Federal Copyright Protection for Pre-1972 Sound Recordings
 Guide to the Rigler-Deutsch Index (ARS.0105) at Stanford University
 Historical Recording Coalition for Access and Preservation
 Association for Recorded Sound Collections (ARSC) records, at the University of Maryland libraries

Sound recording
History organizations based in the United States
Library-related professional associations
Archivist associations